Stephanie Vogt and Zheng Saisai were the defending champions, however Zheng chose to participate at the 2015 China International Challenger instead. Vogt partnered Verónica Cepede Royg, but they lost in the quarterfinals.

Yuliya Beygelzimer and Margarita Gasparyan won the title, defeating Aleksandra Krunić and Petra Martić in the final, 6–3, 6–2.

Seeds

Draw

References 
 Draw

Empire Slovak Open - Doubles